Joseph Jules François Félix Babinski (17 November 1857 – 29 October 1932) was a French-Polish professor of neurology. He is best known for his 1896 description of the Babinski sign, a pathological plantar reflex indicative of corticospinal tract damage.

Life
Born in Paris, Babinski was the son of a Polish military officer, Aleksander Babiński (1824–1889), and his wife Henryeta Weren Babińska (1819–1897), who in 1848 fled Warsaw for Paris because of a Tsarist reign of terror instigated to stall Polish attempts at achieving independence and breaking the union between Congress Poland and the Russian Empire.

Babinski received his medical degree from the University of Paris in 1884. He came early to Professor Charcot at Paris' Salpêtrière Hospital and became his favorite student. 

Charcot's 1893 death left Babinski without support, and he subsequently never participated in qualifying academic competitions. Free of teaching duties, while working at the Hôpital de la Pitié he was left with ample time to devote himself to clinical neurology. He was a masterful clinician, minimally dependent on neuropathological examinations and laboratory tests.

Babinski also took an interest in the pathogenesis of hysteria and was the first to present acceptable differential-diagnostic criteria for separating hysteria from organic diseases, and coined the concept of pithiatism.  In 1914, Babinski introduced the important concept of ‘anosognosia’ to name a disorder characterized by denial of illness or lack of awareness of disability.

In 1896, at a meeting of the Société de Biologie, Babiński, in a 26-line presentation, delivered the first report on the "phenomène des orteils", i.e., that while the normal reflex of the sole of the foot is a plantar reflex of the toes, an injury to the pyramidal tract will show an isolated dorsal flexion of the great toe—"Babinski's sign."

During World War I, Babinski had charge of many traumatic neurology cases at the Pitié Hospitals.

He was professor of neurology at the University of Paris.

Babinski wrote over 200 papers on nervous disorders. With Jules Froment he published Hysteropithiatisme en Neurologie de Guerre (1917), which was translated into English in 1918 by Sir H. Rolleston. Babiński published some of his works in Polish.

Babinski lived with his younger brother, Henri Babinski, a distinguished engineer and famous cook who, as "Ali Baba," published a classic cookbook.

With Pierre Palau, Babinski, under the pseudonym "Olaf," wrote a disturbing play, Les détraquées, which premiered at the Deux-Masques theater in 1921. The play involves the murder of a young pupil at a girls' school by the school's principal and her accomplice, a dance teacher. André Breton discusses the work in Nadja.

Babinski died in the same year as two great Polish neurologists, Edward Flatau and Samuel Goldflam. In his last years he had suffered from Parkinson's disease.

Recognition
Babinski lived to see his achievements in French neurology internationally acclaimed. He was honored by Poland in 1925 as honorary profesor of the Wilno University, by the American Neurological Society, and by other foreign societies. He is also a patron of the three large neuro-psychatric hospitals in Poland (Kraków, Wrocław, Łódź).

Associated eponyms

Babinski's sign: A pathological reflex where the great toe extends in presence of an injury to the pyramidal tract.
Anton–Babinski syndrome: A condition characterized by denial of blindness in lesions of the occipital lobe.Named with neurologist Gabriel Anton.
Babinski–Fröhlich syndrome or Adiposo-genital syndrome: Condition characterized by feminine obesity and sexual infantilism in case of pituitary tumours.Named with pharmacologist Alfred Fröhlich.
Babinski–Froment syndrome: Vasomotor and trophic disorders, diffuse amyotrophy and muscle contractions subsequently to traumatic tissue damage.Named with neurologist Jules Froment.
Babinski–Jarkowski rule: For localization of a medullary lesion.Named with neurologist Jean Jarkowski.
Babinski–Nageotte syndrome: Syndrome seen in unilateral bulbar lesions of the medullobulbar transitional region.Named with neurologist Jean Nageotte.
Babinski–Vaquez syndrome: Tabes dorsalis associated with cardiac and arterial pathology as late manifestation of syphilis.Named with hematologist Louis Henri Vaquez.
Babinski–Weil test: Test for demonstration of a laterodeviation in case of vestibular disorders.Named with neurologist Mathieu-Pierre Weil.

See also
 A Clinical Lesson at the Salpêtrière

Footnotes

External links

Biography of Joseph Babinski, from whonamedit.com
Joseph Jules François Félix Babinski (1857–1932) – short biography by Janusz H. Skalski published in the Journal of Neurology

1857 births
1932 deaths
French neuroscientists
French people of Polish descent
History of neuroscience
Scientists from Paris